Tralcán Formation is a sedimentary formation of Triassic age in Los Ríos Region in south–central Chile. It overlies unconformably the Trafún Metamorphic Complex. Tralcán Formation and nearby Panguipulli Formation form possibly the remnants of an ancient lake and river system. The formation is named after Mount Tralcán on the western edge of Riñihue Lake.

Description 
The Tralcán Formation was first defined by Aguirre and Levi in 1964, based on the outcrop at Tralcán. The shales of the formation contain abundant fossil flora. Fossils of Cladophlebistenia oeshi have helped to redefine the age of the formation, that was formerly considered Late Jurassic (Kimmeridgian to Tithonian), to the Rhaetian of the Triassic.

Fossil content 
The following genera of fossil flora have been identified in the formation:

 Asterotheca
 Cladophlebis
 Dicroidium
 Ginkgoites
 Gleichenites
 Heidiphyllum
 Johnstonia
 Lepidopteris
 Linguifolium
 Neocalamites
 Phoenicopsis
 Pseudoctenis
 Pterophyllum
 Rissikia
 Sphenobaiera
 Taeniopteris

References

Bibliography 
 
 

Geologic formations of Chile
Triassic Chile
Rhaetian Stage
Conglomerate formations
Shale formations
Lacustrine deposits
Fluvial deposits
Fossiliferous stratigraphic units of South America
Paleontology in Chile
Geology of Los Ríos Region